Ernest Harlington Barnes (3 April 1899 – 4 May 1985) was a Bermudian dairy farmer, member of the Legislative Council of Bermuda and politician for the United Bermuda Party.

References 

United Bermuda Party politicians
1899 births
1985 deaths